The Raw Air 2022 was the fifth edition of Raw Air for men and the 3rd edition for women held across Norway between 2–6 March 2022. It is part of the 2021/22 World Cup season.

Results

Men

Women

References 

2022
2022 in ski jumping
2022 in Norwegian sport
March 2022 sports events in Norway